Harold Smith (10 March 1904 – after 1928) was an English footballer who played as an inside left in the Football League for West Ham United.

Smith was born in North Shields in 1904. He played local football for Cullercoats before signing for Newcastle United for the 1925–26 season. He remained there for two seasons without playing first-team football, featuring only for the reserve team. When Jimmy Loughlin was sold to First Division club West Ham United in May 1927, Smith and another teammate, George Robson, also made the move. He played only once for the first team, standing in for Vivian Gibbins at inside left for the home match against Manchester United on 29 October; West Ham lost 2–1. He then returned to the north-east in August 1928 to join Blyth Spartans and later played for West Stanley.

References

1904 births
Year of death missing
Sportspeople from North Shields
Footballers from Tyne and Wear
English footballers
Association football forwards
Newcastle United F.C. players
West Ham United F.C. players
Blyth Spartans A.F.C. players
West Stanley F.C. players
English Football League players